Josh Imatorbhebhe (born April 12, 1998) is an American football wide receiver who is a free agent. He played college football at the University of Illinois.  Despite playing two years as a graduate transfer (from the USC Trojans) with the Illini, he finished his career 7th on the school's all-time receiving touchdowns list.  In 2020, he led the team in receptions, receiving yards and touchdowns.

High school career
247Sports had Imatorbhebhe as a four-star recruit out of North Gwinnett High School where he led the team to the 2014 Class AAAAAA Georgia state championship game. They ranked him the 123rd best recruit in the nation, 18th among wide receivers and 13th in Georgia. He was 2014 All-Region 7-AAAAAA first-team, 2015 Prep Star All-American Dream Team, and 2015 Gwinnett Daily Post All-County third-team.

College career

USC
Imatorbhebhe enrolled at USC in 2016, redshirting his freshman year, before seeing limited game time, playing in 6 games as a redshirt freshman in 2017.

Illinois
Imatorbhebhe finished the 2019 season with 33 receptions for 634 receiving yards.  His nine receiving touchdowns is second in school history for a single season and was fifth in the Big Ten that year.  His 4-reception, 178-yard performance against Michigan State on November 9, 2019, earned him Big Ten Offensive Player of the Week honors. He was an All-Big Ten honorable mention in 2019 as a redshirt junior. He was a 2020 Athlon Preseason All-Big Ten selection.

At Illinois' 2021 pro day, Imatorbhebhe jumped what would have been an NFL Scouting Combine record 46.5 inches in the vertical. His physical ability first gained national attention when as a 17-year-old he leaped 46 inches at Nike's "The Opening" football camp in 2015.

Professional career
On May 1, 2021, Imatorbhebhe signed with the Jacksonville Jaguars as an undrafted free agent. He was waived/injured on August 17, 2021 and placed on injured reserve. He was released on August 26. He was re-signed to the practice squad on October 12. He was released on November 1. On July 13, 2022, Imatorbhebhe announced via his LinkedIn profile he was retiring from football and had accepted a strategy consulting role with Deloitte.

Personal life
Imatorbhebhe is from Suwanee, Georgia. He earned his bachelor's degree in business administration from USC in May 2019, and studied strategic brand communication at Illinois as a graduate student.  His brother Daniel played at USC from 2016–2019 and is a graduate transfer tight end at Kansas State.

References

External links 
 Illinois Fighting Illini bio
 USC Trojans bio

1998 births
Living people
American football wide receivers
People from Suwanee, Georgia
University of Southern California alumni
USC Trojans football players
Illinois Fighting Illini football players
Jacksonville Jaguars players